George Weston may refer to:

People
 George Weston (1864–1924), Canadian businessman
 George Weston (lawyer) (1876–1957), New Zealand lawyer and cricketer
 George Weston (physicist) (1925–2009), English physicist and author
 George G. Weston (born 1964), British businessman
 George W. Weston (1931–2006), American singer

Other uses
 George Weston Limited, a Canadian food production and distribution company
 George Weston Foods, an Australian food company

See also

 Weston (disambiguation)
 George (disambiguation)